Hjalmar Emanuel Lundin (1870–1941) was a Swedish wrestler and strongman who was for many years the undefeated champion of New York City.

Biography
Lundin was born on 22 September 1870 in Husby-Sjuhundra in the Roslagen area of Sweden. He was one of his country's wrestling pioneers. He later moved to the United States where he started out as a professional "giant" in Ringling Brothers circus.  Despite his size, Lundin was regarded as a clean and speedy wrestler. On January 21, 1908 Lundin was defeated by World Champion Frank Gotch in Lowell, Massachusetts. In January 1910 Mitsuyo Maeda and Hjalmar Lundin took part in a wrestling tournament in Mexico City.

Publication
On the Mat-and Off: Memoirs of a Wrestler (1937)

References

1871 births
1941 deaths
Swedish wrestlers